Paz (Spanish for "Peace") is a Spanish Earth observation and reconnaissance satellite launched on 22 February 2018. It is Spain's first spy satellite. The satellite is operated by Hisdesat. Paz was previously referred to as SEOSAR (Satélite Español de Observación SAR).

Overview 
For observational purposes, Paz uses a synthetic aperture radar (SAR) to collect images of Earth for governmental and commercial use, as well as other ship tracking and weather sensors, which enables high-resolution mapping of large geographical areas at day and night.

The Paz satellite is operated in a constellation with the German SAR fleet TerraSAR-X and TanDEM-X on the same orbit. The collaboration was agreed on by both Hisdesat and former European aerospace manufacturer Astrium, operator of the two other satellites. The high-resolution images will be used for military operations, border control, intelligence, environmental monitoring, protection of natural resources, city, and infrastructure planning, and monitoring of natural catastrophes.

Originally, Paz was scheduled for launch from the Yasny launch base, Russia, in 2014, but this was delayed due to Russia's 2014 annexation of Crimea, resulting in an International Court of Arbitration legal battle between Hisdesat and Kosmotras.

Launch 
The satellite launched on a reused Falcon 9 rocket by SpaceX from Vandenberg Air Force Base, SLC-4E on 22 February 2018 at 14:17 UTC. The satellite hosted two secondary payloads: an AIS receiver and the Radio-Occultation and Heavy Precipitation (ROHP) experiment. The launch was shared by two  SpaceX test satellites for their Starlink, named Tintin A and B. It was the final flight of a Block 3 first stage, and reused the booster B1038 from the Formosat-5 mission. The payloads were carried to a Sun-synchronous dawn-dusk orbit. The launch was originally scheduled for 30 January 2018.

The booster flew without landing legs and was expended at sea. It also featured Fairing 2.0 with a recovery attempt using a crew boat named Mr. Steven that is equipped with a net. The fairing narrowly missed the boat, leading to a soft water landing.

Gallery

References 

Satellites of Spain
2018 in Spain
Spacecraft launched in 2018
SpaceX military payloads
Synthetic aperture radar satellites
INTA satellites
Imaging reconnaissance satellites
Military equipment introduced in the 2010s
Earth observation satellites
Satellites in low Earth orbit